The Kingston Frontenac Public Library (KFPL) was established in 1998 through the amalgamation of the Kingston Public Library (which began as a 19th-century Mechanics Institute) and the Frontenac County Library, creating a 17-branch system.  The KFPL serves the city of Kingston and Frontenac County in Ontario, Canada.  The library regularly welcomes visitors from outside of this region. The KFPL has a board made up of appointees and representatives from Kingston City Council and Frontenac County Council. The board operates using the Carver Model.

Services
Information and reference services 
Access to full text databases 
Community information 
Internet access 
Reader's advisory services 
Programs for children, youth and adults 
 Delivery to homebound individuals
 Interlibrary loan
 Free downloadable audiobooks and e-books

History
It was one of a series of Mechanics' Institutes that were set up around the world after becoming popular in Britain. It housed a subscription library that allowed members who paid a fee to borrow books. The Mechanics' Institutes libraries eventually became public libraries when the establishment of free libraries occurred. The Mechanics Institute in Kingston was founded in 1834; in 1895, the Kingston Public Library was established, making it one of the first public libraries in Canada.

Branches
There are five branches within the city of Kingston and eleven branches throughout Frontenac County. The library branches include:

Arden
Calvin Park
Central (main branch)
Cloyne
Hartington
Howe Island
Isabel Turner
Mountain Grove
Parham
Pittsburgh
Plevna
Rideau Heights
Sharbot Lake
Storrington
Sydenham
Wolfe Island

See also
Ask Ontario
Ontario Public Libraries

References

External links
Kingston Frontenac Public Library
Official City of Kingston Website
Kingston Branch, Ontario Genealogical Society Website

Education in Frontenac County
Public libraries in Ontario
Buildings and structures in Kingston, Ontario
Education in Kingston, Ontario
Libraries established in 1895
1895 establishments in Canada